Robert Harold Waterman  (11 March 1894 - 16 December 1984) was a Canadian Anglican bishop in the 20th century.

Waterman was born into an ecclesiastical family, educated at University of Bishop's College, Lennoxville  and ordained in 1921.

After a curacy at  Bearbrook he held incumbencies at Pembroke and Smith's Falls. He was Dean of Niagara from 1938 to 1948 when he became Bishop Coadjutor of Nova Scotia. He was appointed its full diocesan two years later and retired in 1963.

References

1894 births
Bishop's University alumni
20th-century Anglican Church of Canada bishops
Anglican bishops of Nova Scotia and Prince Edward Island
1984 deaths
Deans of Niagara